Burnside Park is a cricket ground in Burnside, Canterbury, New Zealand.  The first recorded match on the ground came when Canterbury Women played Auckland Women in 1974.  The ground later held its only first-class match in 1991 when Canterbury played Central Districts in the 1991/92 Shell Trophy, with the match ending in a 3 wicket victory for Canterbury.

It is the home ground of the Burnside West Christchurch University Cricket Club.

The park also has Burnside Rugby Club, Burnside Bowling Club, Burnside Tennis Club as well as other recreation facilities.

References

External links
Burnside Park at ESPNcricinfo
Burnside Park at CricketArchive

Cricket grounds in New Zealand
Sports venues in Christchurch
Association football venues in New Zealand